Qianzhong Commandery was a historical commandery of the state of Chu during the Warring States period (481 BC - 221 BC). It was mentioned in the section Biography of Su Qin of Sima Qian's Records of the Grand Historian or Strategies of the Warring States. It is located roughy in modern-day western Hunan and eastern Guizhou.

References

Chu (state)